St Trinian's is a 2007 British comedy film and the sixth in a long-running series of British films based on the works of cartoonist Ronald Searle set in St Trinian's School. The first five films form a series, starting with The Belles of St. Trinian's in 1954, with sequels in 1957, 1960, 1966 and a reboot in 1980. The release of 2007, 27 years after the last entry, and 53 years after the first film, is a rebooting of the franchise, rather than a direct sequel, with certain plot elements borrowed from the first film.

Whereas the earlier films concentrated on the adults, this film gives the school pupils greater prominence. St Trinian's is an anarchic school for uncontrollable girls run by eccentric headmistress Camilla Dagey Fritton (the reboot continues the tradition, established by Alastair Sim in the original film, of casting a male actor to play the female headmistress, with Rupert Everett inheriting the role).

St Trinian's received mixed reviews but remains one of the highest-grossing British independent films of the last thirty years.

Plot
Annabelle Fritton, an uptight daddy's girl, unwillingly transfers to St Trinian's from the distinguished Cheltenham Ladies' College at the request of her father, Carnaby Fritton. Annabelle is resentful and insulting, telling her father that the school is "like Hogwarts for pikeys". She is taken around the school by Kelly Jones, the head girl, who introduces her to the various cliques within the school.

Annabelle is harassed and pranked by the girls while in the shower and a video of her running around the school naked and wet is broadcast live on the internet. After a phone argument with her father she is drafted to the hockey team when she hits her phone with her hockey stick, smashing a statue. The girls of St Trinian's are involved in business with spiv Flash Harry, who pays them to make cheap vodka. Flash is shown to be romantically interested in Kelly, who initially turns him down.

The Cheltenham Ladies' College hockey team arrive at St Trinian's, along with Education Minister Geoffrey Thwaites. Thwaites is shown to have romantic history with the headmistress of St Trinian's, Camilla Fritton. Annabelle is forced to face her former bullies, including captain Verity Thwaites. The hockey match is violent, ending in Kelly shooting a winning goal for St Trinian's, and she begins to fit in with the other girls. As the match is being played, Thwaites inspects the school, finding the illegal vodka-making business and the chatline being run by the Posh Totty clique.

The following morning, a banker arrives at the school and serves Camilla with a foreclosure notice, as the school owes the bank in excess of £500,000 and has ignored six previous final demands. A subsequent meeting between Camilla and Carnaby is watched by the girls using hidden cameras, in which Carnaby confesses his distaste towards his daughter. Annabelle is clearly upset, despite Camilla defending her. Carnaby encourages Camilla to turn the school into a boutique hotel, telling her that "when this school closes down, you'll have lost everything. More importantly, so will I."

Kelly and Flash work with the students to devise a plan to save the school. They must get into the final of School Challenge, a TV quiz show held in the National Gallery in London, as a cover for stealing Vermeer's Girl With a Pearl Earring. Chelsea, Peaches and Chloe (the Posh Totty clique) are chosen as the School Challenge Team. By cheating in every round, they make it to the grand final. As the final is being filmed, Kelly, Taylor and Andrea steal the painting, with help from the Geeks, Annabelle and Camilla herself.

Camilla paints an exact copy of the painting and has Flash, posing as a German art dealer, sell it to Carnaby in a black market deal. The school then receives a further £50,000 reward for returning the real painting to the National Gallery. The loans are able to be repaid and the school is saved.

Cast and characters

 Talulah Riley as Annabelle Fritton, a shy new student at St Trinian's after Carnaby, her father, dumps her there, and Camilla's niece
 Lily Cole as Polly, the Geek
 Juno Temple as Celia, the "Trustafarian" one
 Kathryn Drysdale as Taylor, the Chav
 Paloma Faith as Andrea, the Emo
 Gemma Arterton as Kelly, the resourceful Head Girl of St Trinian's
 Tamsin Egerton as Chelsea, a Posh Totty
 Antonia Bernath as Chloe, a Posh Totty
 Amara Karan as Peaches, a Posh Totty
 Cloe and Holly Mackie as Tara & Tania, the Twins
 Caterina Murino as Miss Maupassant, the Foreign Languages Teacher
 Celia Imrie as Matron, of St Trinian's
 Jodie Whittaker as Beverly, the receptionist at St Trinian's
 Stephen Fry as Stephen Fry, the School Challenge presenter
 Toby Jones as Bursar, of St Trinian's
 Fenella Woolgar as Miss Cleaver, the Sports Teacher
 Anna Chancellor as Miss Bagstock, Cheltenham School's Headmistress
 Lucy Punch as Verity Thwaites, the Minister's daughter, and Cheltenham's school bully
 Lena Headey as Miss Dickinson, St Trinian's new English Teacher
 Mischa Barton as JJ French, the PR Guru, and previous Head Girl of St Trinian's
 Russell Brand as Flash, the spiv
 Rupert Everett as Camilla Fritton / Carnaby Fritton, St Trinian's Headmistress and Annabelle's aunt, and Camilla's brother and Annabelle's father, respectively
 Colin Firth as Geoffrey Thwaites, the Education Minister
 Dolly as Mr Darcy

 Theo Cross as Art Teacher
 Tereza Srbova as Anoushka
 Steve Furst as Bank Manager

The members of Girls Aloud (Nicola Roberts, Kimberley Walsh, Sarah Harding, Nadine Coyle and Cheryl) all make cameo appearances as the members of St Trinian's school band in the film. Zöe Salmon also makes a cameo as an emo girl, while Nathaniel Parker, the director's real life brother, makes a short appearance as the Chairman of the National Gallery. Newscaster Jeremy Thompson also briefly appears, as himself.

Music
The film's score was composed by Charlie Mole.

Soundtrack

The film's soundtrack was released on 10 December 2007 via Universal Music Group. The album featured two original songs by British pop group Girls Aloud, including the single, "Theme to St. Trinian's". A music video for the song was released to promote the film and soundtrack.

The film's cast also recorded the theme, as well as a cover of Shampoo's "Trouble". A music video of the cast performing "Trouble" was also released. Rupert Everett and Colin Firth, who star in the film, recorded the John Paul Young song "Love Is in the Air". A number of popular singles or current album tracks by artists, such as Mark Ronson, Lily Allen, Noisettes, Gabriella Cilmi, and Sugababes, were included on the soundtrack.

Track listing

Filming locations

Park Place, Remenham, Berkshire, England (St Trinian's school)
Ealing Studios, Ealing, London, England
London, England
Oxfordshire, England
The National Gallery, London, England, (exteriors, The National Gallery)
Trafalgar Square, St James's, London, England

Release
St Trinian's premiered in London on 10 December 2007 and was theatrically released on 21 December 2007 by Entertainment Film Distributors.

Home media
St Trinian's was released on DVD on 14 April 2008 by Entertainment in Video.

Reception

Box office
The film grossed £12,042,854 in the United Kingdom, surpassing its £7 million production budget. As of 18 July 2010 the film had grossed a worldwide total of $29,066,483. It was the fifth highest-grossing film during the Christmas season of 2007, behind Enchanted, I Am Legend, Aliens vs. Predator: Requiem and The Golden Compass. It ranks in the top grossing independent British films of the past decade.

Critical response

St Trinian's received mixed reviews. Empire wrote that the film "fuse[s] an understanding of what made the originals great with a modern feel – the writers have fulfilled their end of the bargain, even tweaking some of the weaker points of the original story."

The Observer wrote that it "is raucous, leering, crude and, to my mind, largely misjudged, with Rupert Everett playing Miss Fritton as a coquettish transvestite with the manners of a Mayfair madam. The attempts to shock us fail, though Cheltenham Ladies College may well be affronted to hear one of its teachers say 'between you and I'. But the preview was packed with girls aged from seven to 14 who found it hilarious, and especially enjoyed Russell Brand."

Derek Malcolm, in The Evening Standard, wrote: "Structurally, the new movie is a mess, and it doesn't look too convincing either, with cinematography that uses all sorts of old-fashioned dodges to raise a laugh", and "when you look at it again, the old film was not only superior but rather more radical. This St Trinian's looks as if it is aiming at the lowest common denominator, and finding it too often."

On the film-critics aggregate website Rotten Tomatoes, St Trinian's holds a 31% positive rating, with the consensus "Both naughtier and campier than Ronald Searle's original postwar series, this St. Trinian's leans on high jinks instead of performances or witty dialogue."

Awards and nominations

Sequel

It was announced at the 2008 Cannes Film Festival that the sequel, The Legend of Fritton's Gold, also directed by Parker and Thompson, would be released in 2009. Filming began on 6 July 2009, and on 7 July 2009, it was announced that David Tennant, Sarah Harding and Montserrat Lombard had all signed on to appear in the sequel.

References

External links
 
 
 
 
 
 St Trinian's at NeoClassics Films

St Trinian's films
2007 films
2000s high school films
2000s teen comedy films
British heist films
British teen comedy films
Cross-dressing in film
2000s feminist films
Films directed by Oliver Parker
Films set in England
Films shot in Berkshire
Films shot in London
Films shot in Oxfordshire
Reboot films
2000s heist films
2007 comedy films
Films set in boarding schools
2000s English-language films
2000s British films